Ryu Myong-yon (born January 9, 1970) is a North Korean sport shooter. Ryu made his official debut for the 1992 Summer Olympics in Barcelona, where he placed twenty-sixth in the 10 m air pistol, and twenty-eighth in the 50 m pistol, accumulating scores of 574 and 550 points, respectively.

Sixteen years after competing in his last Olympics, Ryu qualified for his second North Korean team, as a 38-year-old, at the 2008 Summer Olympics in Beijing, by receiving a place from the 2006 ISSF World Shooting Championships in Zagreb, Croatia. He finished only in twenty-seventh place in the preliminary rounds of the men's 50 m pistol, by four points behind South Korea's Lee Dae-myung from the fifth attempt, for a total score of 551 targets.

References

External links
NBC 2008 Olympics profile

North Korean male sport shooters
Living people
Olympic shooters of North Korea
Shooters at the 1992 Summer Olympics
Shooters at the 2008 Summer Olympics
1970 births
Asian Games medalists in shooting
Shooters at the 1990 Asian Games
Shooters at the 1998 Asian Games
Shooters at the 2002 Asian Games
Shooters at the 2006 Asian Games
Shooters at the 2010 Asian Games
Asian Games gold medalists for North Korea
Asian Games silver medalists for North Korea
Asian Games bronze medalists for North Korea
Medalists at the 1990 Asian Games
Medalists at the 1998 Asian Games
Medalists at the 2002 Asian Games
Medalists at the 2010 Asian Games
20th-century North Korean people
21st-century North Korean people